The 2015–16 North Carolina Central Eagles men's basketball team represented North Carolina Central University during the 2015–16 NCAA Division I men's basketball season. The Eagles, led by seventh year head coach LeVelle Moton, played their home games at the McLendon–McDougald Gymnasium and were members of the Mid-Eastern Athletic Conference. They finished the season 13–19, 7–9 in MEAC play to finish in a three way tie for sixth place. They defeated Howard in the first round of the MEAC tournament to advance to the quarterfinals where they lost to Norfolk State.

Roster

Schedule

|-
!colspan=9 style="background:#800000; color:#C0C0C0;"| Regular season

|-
!colspan=9 style="background:#800000; color:#C0C0C0;"| MEAC tournament

References

North Carolina Central Eagles men's basketball seasons
North Carolina Central
2015 in sports in North Carolina
2016 in sports in North Carolina